Jonathan Mackey (born 1 June 1977) is a South African cricketer. He played in two first-class and two List A matches for Boland in 1997/98.

See also
 List of Boland representative cricketers

References

External links
 

1977 births
Living people
South African cricketers
Boland cricketers
Cricketers from Durban